California's 36th district may refer to:

 California's 36th congressional district
 California's 36th State Assembly district
 California's 36th State Senate district